Deepwater Discovery was a Samsung/Reading & Bates designed, fifth generation, deepwater dynamic positioning Vanuatu-flagged drillship owned and operated by Transocean. It was retired in 2018.

From 2000 to 2009 the vessel flew the flag of Panama.

References

External links
Transocean official website

2000 ships
Drillships
Ships built by Samsung Heavy Industries
Transocean